Under Strange Flags is a 1937 American drama film directed by I. V. Willat and starring Tom Keene, Luana Walters, and Maurice Black. It was released on August 16, 1937. During production, it was also titled South of Sonora and Beyond Victory at various times.

Cast list
 Tom Keene as Tom Kenyon
 Luana Walters as Dolores de Vargas
 Maurice Black as Pancho Villa
 Chris-Pin Martin as Lopez
 Budd Buster as Tequila
 Ernest Gillen as Garcia
 Jane Wolfe as Mrs. Kenyon
 Paul Sutton as General Barranca
 Roy D'Arcy as Morales
 Paul Barrett as Denny de Vargas

References

External links
 
 

1937 drama films
1937 films
American black-and-white films
American drama films
1930s American films